Saqlain Arshad (born 10 October 1992) is a cricketer who plays for the Qatar national cricket team. In September 2019, he was named in Qatar's squad for the 2019 Malaysia Cricket World Cup Challenge League A tournament. He made his List A debut for Qatar, against Singapore, in the Cricket World Cup Challenge League A tournament on 17 September 2019. In October 2019, he was named in Qatar's Twenty20 International (T20I) squad for their series against Jersey. He made his T20I debut for Qatar, against Jersey, on 9 October 2019.

References

External links
 

1992 births
Living people
Qatari cricketers
Qatar Twenty20 International cricketers
Pakistani expatriates in Qatar
Place of birth missing (living people)